McFetridge is a surname, anglicized form of Scottish Gaelic Mac Pheadruis, patronymic from a Gaelic form of the given name Peter. Notable people with the surname include:

Duncan McFetridge (born 1952), Australian politician
Edward C. McFetridge (1836–1914), American lawyer, businessman and politician
Jack McFetridge (1869–1917), American baseball player
Olcan McFetridge (born 1963), Irish hurler
Peter McFetridge (born 1986), Canadian lacrosse player
William McFetridge (1893–1969), American labor leader

References

Anglicised Scottish Gaelic-language surnames